Trinity Grammar School may refer to:

In Australia:
 Trinity Grammar School (Victoria) located in the Melbourne suburb of Kew, Victoria
 Trinity Grammar School (New South Wales) located in the Sydney suburb of Summer Hill, New South Wales
 Trinity Grammar School Preparatory School located in the Sydney suburb of Strathfield, New South Wales

In the United Kingdom:
 Woodside High School, Wood Green, formerly known as Trinity Grammar School

See also 
 Trinity School (disambiguation)